Sunkoshi Rural Municipality is a rural municipality in Sindhupalchowk District of Bagmati Province in Nepal.  According to the 2011 Nepal census, the total population of the municipality is 16713 and total area of the municipality is   The Rural municipality is divided into 7 wards and the headquarter of the municipality is located at Pangretar.

The rural municipality was established on March 10, 2017 when Ministry of Federal Affairs and Local Development dissolved the existing village development committees and announced the establishment of this new local body.

Thokarpa, Kalika, Thumpakhar, Sunkhani, Yamunadanda and Pangretar VDCs were merged to form the new rural municipality.

References

External links
 Official website

Populated places in Sindhupalchowk District
Rural municipalities in Sindhupalchowk District
Rural municipalities of Nepal established in 2017